HMS Poictiers was a 74-gun Royal Navy third rate. This ship of the line was launched on 9 December 1809 at Upnor. During the War of 1812 she was part of blockade of the United States. She was broken up in 1857.

Active service
On 22 April 1811, Poictiers,  and the hired armed cutter Nimrod captured the French vessel Auguste. They removed her cargo of casks of wine and destroyed the ship.

Magnet disappeared during the voyage and was presumed foundered with all hands.

On 18 October 1812, Poictiers participated in an action where she rescued  by capturing , commanded by Jacob Jones.  Four hours after Wasp had captured Frolic, Captain Sir John Poer Beresford hove in sight and captured Wasp and recaptured Frolic. He then brought both to Bermuda. Frolic returned to duty and Wasp became HMS Loup Cervier. In November 1818 the proceeds of the sales of ordnance stores and head-money for the men captured on board Wasp, also for ordnance stores recaptured on board Frolic was paid.

Thereafter, Poictiers captured a number of merchant vessels, alone or with other ships.
 29 October: the brig Little William, of the Isle of Mayo and sailing to Philadelphia;
 3 November: the brig Logan, from Boston, sailing to Baltimore;
 25 November: the ship Rebecca, from Philadelphia and sailing to Madeira;
 11 December: schooner Betsy, from Providence (Rhode Island), sailing to Norfolk;
 December: ship Pekin, from Boston sailing to Alexandria (Poictiers in company with ).

One of these may or may not have been a ship from Brazil carrying a cargo of hides and tallow that  had captured. Poictiers recaptured the ship off the Virginia Capes in mid-December and sent her into Bermuda.

On 28 December Poictiers and Acasta captured the American letter of marque Herald, of 18 guns (10 mounted), and 50 men, as Herald was sailing from Bordeaux to Baltimore. Herald, prior to herself being captured, had taken a ship, a brig, and a schooner. The cargo of the ship Friendship alone had an estimated value of US$400,000.

More captures followed.

Poictiers took the American schooner , of five guns and 72 men, on 9 January 1813. She was on her return from the West Indies, where she had made several captures. Under the command of Captain Jeremiah Grant, Highflyer, of Baltimore, had captured two ships, four brigs, one schooner and one sloop; three of these vessels had been armed. The Royal Navy took Highflyer into service under her existing name.

In early January 1813, the warships of the squadron blockading New York, of which Poictiers was one, captured a number of vessels:

 Schooners Syren and Tropic, sailing from New York to Charleston;
 Sloop Almira, New York to Fredericksburg;
 Brig Industry, Rhode Island to Virginia; and,
 Brig Caroline, Charleston to New York.

The British armed Syren with one gun and gave her a crew of 40 men. She then captured American Eagle, Herlitz, master, which had been sailing from Cadiz to New York.

 17 January 1813: ship Lydia, from Rhode Islands sailing to Norfolk (Poictiers in company with Acasta and Maidstone; and,
 January: schooner Rhoda (Poictiers and Acasta).
 24 February: American brigs Gustavus and Staunch (Poictiers shared with six other British ships);
 24 February: American brig Hannah (Poictiers with the same six other British ships).
 13 March 1813: Swedish brig, from Martinique.
 17 April: Portuguese schooner Alliance, sailing from Philadelphia to Jamaica with a cargo of flour, and sent in to Bermuda;
 28 April: English schooner Bermuda recaptured while sailing from Bermuda to Philadelphia, and used as a tender to Poictiers;
 1 May: American sloop Providence sailing from Philadelphia to Boston with a cargo of flour and corn, and sent in to Bermuda; and
 10 May: American sloop Factor sailing from Philadelphia to Boston with a cargo of cotton, cargo removed and vessel set adrift.

Poictiers was part of a squadron of 12 ships that shared in the capture on 13 and 14 March of Christina and Massatoit.

On 4 (or 5) July 1813 the American smack Yankee captured the brig Eagle, which was serving as a tender to Poictiers. The Americans put 40 militiamen on board Yankee and sailed her where Eagle was known to be patrolling. The militiamen concealed themselves while on Yankees deck there were three men dressed as fishermen, and a calf, a goose, and a sheep were tethered. When Yankee encountered Eagle, Eagle fell for the bait of fresh meat and came alongside. The Americans, under Sailing-Master Percival, came out of hiding and fired their small arms. Although Eagle carried a brass 32-pounder howitzer loaded with canister, she was unable to get off a shot. The Americans then took Eagle into New York. Eagle had two men killed, including her commander Master's Mate H. Morris, and Midshipman W. Price mortally wounded. The remaining eight seamen were taken prisoner.

Poictiers, with Poictiers and Maidstone in company, captured Yorktown, of 20 guns and 140 men, on 17 July. Yorktown, under Captain T. W. Story, had taken 11 prizes, including Manchester, before Maidstone captured Yorktown after a four-hour chase. The British sent Yorktown and her crew into Halifax, Nova Scotia.{{efn|The Haifax Vie-admiralty records give the name of York Ton'"s master as A. Ricker.}}Poictiers in company with Maidstone and  captured several vessels.
 13 August 1813: brig Anna, of 125 tons, Diego Martinez, master, sailing from Newhaven to Laguira.
 18 August: ship .Poictiers alone captured:
 29 August: brig Mariner; and
 3 September: brig Watson.

These incidents aside, Poictiers had an uneventful war, though there is a record of one humorous incident. The exhibit center of the town of Lewes, Delaware, has a framed copy of a handwritten letter from Captain Beresford to the town's chief magistrate. Dated 16 March 1813, the letter says:

Col. Samuel Boyer Davis, commander of American troops in Lewes, refused the demand, so on 6 and 7 April Beresford shelled the town, killing a chicken and wounding a pig. There is a cannonball from Poictiers lodged in the stone foundation of Lewes's Marine Museum.

In November 1813 Poictiers was at Halifax, Nova Scotia, preparing to escort a convoy of merchant vessels to England when a gale hit the city. It destroyed or damaged many vessels, though Poictiers was able to ride out the gale.Poictiers was at Chatham in 1814.

Post war and FatePoictiers underwent a "Large Repair" at Chatham between April 1815 September 1817. She was fitted at Sheerness as a guard ship between March 1836 and September 1837. She remained in that role at Chatham until March 1848 when she became a depot ship until 1850. In 1857 she was sold out of service and broken up, the breaking up being completed on 23 March 1857.

PostscriptPoictier's'' figurehead went to the small museum in Chatham Dockyard. In the 1920s, the figurehead was moved to Sheerness and placed on display inside the dockyard but towards the 1980s, the condition of the wood was such that the figure fell apart, leaving no single piece that could reasonably be salvaged for purposes of reconstruction.

The pieces were therefore used, in conjunction with archive photographs, to carve a replica. Andy Peters was commissioned to analyse samples of the paint and to carry out the carving. He then created a sculpture that provides a record of the figure's former glory, complete with gold leaf detailing. Since 2008, the replica has been on display for public viewing at the Blue Town Heritage Centre alongside the original figurehead from   after Peel Holdings donated the pair.

Notes, citations, and references
Notes

Citations

References

 
 
  

Ships of the line of the Royal Navy
Vengeur-class ships of the line
1809 ships
War of 1812 ships of the United Kingdom
Ships built on the River Medway